Patrick Howard (born 7 October 1947) is an English former professional footballer who played as a central defender.

Howard made more than 500 appearances in the Football League for Barnsley, Newcastle United, Arsenal, Birmingham City and Bury, and also appeared in the NASL for Portland Timbers.

Career
Born in Dodworth, Barnsley, West Riding of Yorkshire, Howard made more than 500 appearances in the Football League. He started his career at Barnsley, spending seven seasons there before signing for Newcastle United in 1971. He reached the 1974 FA Cup Final with the Magpies, and was signed by Arsenal for £40,000 in September 1976. He made his debut against West Ham United on 11 September 1976, but did not settle at the club and after less than a year he was transfer listed with just 20 Arsenal appearances, without a single goal to his name.

He moved to Birmingham City in August 1977, and after two seasons there finished his career in English football with a three-year stint at Bury, retiring in 1982. He also spent the 1978 North American Soccer League season playing for Portland Timbers.

Honours
Newcastle United
FA Cup runners-up: 1973–74
League Cup runners-up: 1975–76

References

1947 births
Living people
Footballers from Barnsley
English footballers
Association football central defenders
Barnsley F.C. players
Newcastle United F.C. players
Arsenal F.C. players
Birmingham City F.C. players
Portland Timbers (1975–1982) players
Bury F.C. players
English Football League players
North American Soccer League (1968–1984) players
English expatriate sportspeople in the United States
Expatriate soccer players in the United States
English expatriate footballers
FA Cup Final players